Robert Chindamba Banda (born December 17, 1985), better known by his stage name Roberto is a multi-award winning Zambian artist, singer and songwriter.

Early life and career
Roberto was born on December 17, 1985 in Chipata to Killion Banda and E.J Banda. His interest in music developed at a very young age as his parents could play musical instruments and his elder brother, David Banda (General Ozzy) is said to be one of the people that inspired him to pick up a career in music.

To date, Roberto has released a total of 5 albums and an EP titled 'Journey To The East'. He has worked with local and international artists. He has worked with the likes of Patoranking, Grammy nominated Eddy Kenzo, Vanessa Mdee and Butera Knowless among others.

Discography

Studio albums

EP(s)

Singles

Awards and nominations

References

Living people
21st-century Zambian male singers
1985 births
People from Chipata District